The 2010–11 Ukrainian Second League was the 20th season of 3rd level professional football in Ukraine. The competitions were divided into two groups according to geographical location in the country – A is western and northern Ukraine and B is eastern and southern Ukraine.

The first game of the season was played on July 23, 2010 in Group A between Chornomorets-2 Odesa and Desna Chernihiv.

The competition had a winter break and resumed April 9, 2011 with a rescheduled match in Group B that was moved forward from its originally scheduled date of April 22, 2011.

Competition information 
Note: Relegation from the League is not covered by the current regulations

The placing of teams in the table is done in the following order:
 number of accumulated points
 difference(GD) between goals for(GF) and goals allowed(GA)
 number of goals for
 The League Fair-play ranking

The next tie-break is a simple draw.

Team changes

Admitted teams 
The following team was promoted from the 2010 Ukrainian Football Amateur League:
 Enerhiya Nova Kakhovka – first group stage participant (debut)

Also, two reserve teams were admitted:
 Chornomorets-2 Odesa – reviving (returning after an absence of six seasons)
 Dnipro-2 Dnipropetrovsk – reviving (returning after an absence of six seasons)
 Last season FC Dnipro-75 Dnipropetrovsk was expelled from the league

Also, two teams were re-admitted:
 FC Sumy (readmitted)
 Desna Chernihiv (readmitted)

Relegated teams 
The following teams were relegated from the 2009–10 Ukrainian First League:
 Desna Chernihiv – (returning after an absence of four seasons)
 Nyva Ternopil – (returning after an absence of a season)
Notes

Group A

Location map

Final standings

Expelled teams

Veres Rivne 

On April 29, 2011, after trying to find financial solvency Veres Rivne were unable to find a financial sponsor, the PFL had no alternative but to expel the club from the PFL. The club was in 12th place and had lost all of their 15 games, including a technical 3–0 loss during the season. All of their spring fixtures were considered technical losses.

Renamed Teams

Skala Stryi 

After playing their home games the first half of the season in Stryi, prior to the start of the spring season Skala Morshyn changed their name to Skala Stryi.

Results

Top goalscorers

Group B

Location map

Final standings

Withdrawn teams

Olkom Melitopol 

On 7 February Olkom Melitopol informed the PFL that they ceased their operations and withdrew from the League during the mid-winter break (after Round 13). All of their spring fixtures are considered technical losses. The club played fourteen games in the League and had a record of 5 wins, 2 draws and 7 losses with 21 goals scored and 22 allowed.

Results

Top goalscorers

Promotion play-off 

A playoff between the two second placed teams was played with the winner participating in another playoff game between the 16th placed team of the First League for a place in the 2011–12 Ukrainian First League competition.

First game

Second game

Stadia

See also 
 2010–11 Ukrainian Premier League
 2010–11 Ukrainian First League
 2010–11 Ukrainian Cup

References 

Ukrainian Second League seasons
3
Ukra